Agafodor is an old and uncommon Russian Christian male first name. The name is derived from the Greek words agathos—meaning kind, good—and dōron—meaning gift.

The diminutives of "Agafodor" are Aga, Dora, and Fodya.

The patronymics derived from "Agafodor" are "" (Agafodorovich; masculine) and "" (Agafodorovna; feminine).

References

Notes

Sources
Н. А. Петровский (N. A. Petrovsky). "Словарь русских личных имён" (Dictionary of Russian First Names). ООО Издательство "АСТ". Москва, 2005. 
А. В. Суперанская (A. V. Superanskaya). "Современный словарь личных имён: Сравнение. Происхождение. Написание" (Modern Dictionary of First Names: Comparison. Origins. Spelling). Айрис-пресс. Москва, 2005. 

